Dowe may refer to:

People 
 Amanda Dowe (born 1991), American basketball player
 Brent Dowe (died 2006), Jamaican musician
 Chris Dowe (born 1991), American basketball player 
 Jens Dowe (born 1968), German athlete
 John Leslie Dowe (fl. from 1994), Australian botanist
 John M. Dowe (1896–1946), American politician
 Julian Dowe (born 1975), English footballer
 Uton Dowe (born 1949), Jamaican cricketer
 Douwe Juwes de Dowe (1608–1662), Dutch painter

Other uses
 Dowe Historic District, in Montgomery, Alabama, U.S.
 Mount Dowe, New South Wales, Australia

See also
 
 Dow (disambiguation)
 Dhow